Disney Channel All Star Party is a party game based on several Disney Channel franchises, exclusively for Wii. This game uses characters, games, and stages from Phineas and Ferb, Jonas, Sonny with a Chance, Wizards of Waverly Place, Hannah Montana, The Suite Life on Deck, and Camp Rock 2: The Final Jam. It was released in North America on October 26, 2010, and in Europe on November 5. It is published by Disney Interactive Studios and developed by Page 44 Studios. It is the first Disney game to feature Miis as player characters.

Gameplay
Disney Channel All Star Party is a party video game in which stages resemble board games, with 30 minigames based on several Disney Channel television series and the Disney Channel Camp Rock films.

References

External links
Official Site
Official game page from Disney Interactive Studios website
Gamespot Profile

2010 video games
Crossover video games
Disney video games
Multiplayer and single-player video games
Page 44 Studios games
Party video games
Video games based on television series
Video games developed in the United States
Wii games
Wii-only games